Satawal is a solitary coral atoll of one island with about 500 people on just over 1 km2 located in the Caroline Islands in the Pacific Ocean. It forms a legislative district in Yap State in the Federated States of Micronesia.

Geography
As there are no anchorages for large boats, Satawal is seldom visited by outsiders. 
Administratively Piagailoe Atoll, located 71 kilometers to the northwest, belongs to Satawal municipality.

Culture
The native language is Satawalese, a Chuukic language closely related to Woleaian, and the entire population of the island numbers approximately 500. Although located in Yap State, the people of Satawal are more closely related, culturally and linguistically, to those of Chuuk.

The Satawalese primarily subsist on fishing and some agriculture (coconuts, breadfruit, taro). They build small thatch houses for sleeping and use the trunks of breadfruit trees for boat-building.  Cultural forms primarily revolve around dance and story-telling, and an alcoholic beverage known as tuba (a palm wine) is brewed from fermented sap of the coconut flower spike.

History
As with all of the Caroline Islands, sovereignty passed from Spain to the Empire of Germany in 1899. The island came under the control of the Empire of Japan after World War I, and was subsequently administered under the South Seas Mandate. Following World War II, the island came under the control of the United States of America and was administered as part of the Trust Territory of the Pacific Islands from 1947, and became part of the Federated States of Micronesia from 1979.

On March 18, 1994, the freighter Oceanus ventured out of the main shipping channel when its captain attempted to peek at topless Satawalese women. The freighter ran aground on the nearby Wenimong Reef, the primary source of food for the islanders, and 13,000 square meters of the reef were ravaged. The freighter's insurer, the North of England P&I Association, ended up paying US$2 million in compensation to the Satawalese.

Expert navigators

The island is best known for its preservation of traditional navigational techniques without the use of instruments, based on indigenous astronomical and maritime concepts. Despite its small population, Satawal has continued to produce ocean-going canoes and expert navigators versed in these traditions.  The best-known of the Satawal master navigators (paliuw), Mau Piailug, served as mentor and teacher to the founding members of the Polynesian Voyaging Society.  The daily life of Satawal is documented in the Steve Thomas book The Last Navigator, which also treats Mau Piailug's traditional navigation system in some depth.  Sanford J. Low produced THE NAVIGATORS: Pathfinders of the Pacific, a documentary film about Mau Piailug and communal life on Satawal including food preparation, fishing and boat building.

On March 18, 2007, Piailug presided over the first Pwo ceremony for navigators on Satawal in 56 years. At the event five native Hawaiians and eleven others were inducted into Pwo as master navigators. The Polynesian Voyaging Society presented Piailug a canoe, the Alingano Maisu, as a gift for his key role in reviving traditional wayfinding navigation in Hawaii.

References

External links
A Return to Paradise account of 1967 visit to Satawal
Steve Thomas Traditional Micronesian Navigation Collection  - photographic materials related primarily to traditional navigation on the island of Satawal Island, Yap

THE NAVIGATORS: Pathfinders of the Pacific, a documentary film of Mau Piailug and communal life on Satawal including food preparation, fishing and boat building. Produced by Sanford J. Low and distributed by The New Film Company, Inc., Cambridge, Massachusetts.
Salvage in Paradise, a documentary film of the Salvage and refloating of the Australian Coal the Bulk Carrier OCEANUS by Svitzer Global.

Atolls of the Federated States of Micronesia
Islands of Yap
Municipalities of Yap